A Sciura is an elderly lady from the city center of Milan, who is essentially rich, elegantly dressed and often easily recognizable by her selfish and careless attitude. 
Language-wise, ‘Sciura’ (pronounced /ˈʃuːra/) is the feminine form of ‘Sciur’, which is the Lombard word for ‘Mister’. Although the word in itself can be literally translated as ‘lady’ or ‘Mrs.’, the actual semantic of the term has evolved to a much broader meaning within the context of the city and its hinterland, especially when used as a common noun and not as an  honorific.

Characteristic features 
In an objective attempt to define her typical aesthetic traits, the 'Sciura' is elegant and refined in her own way, but with an attitude; she is elderly, wealthy and usually living downtown, where she either wears timeless high fashion designed clothing or outdated and just as expensive fancy clothes, which often include furs and pearl necklaces, along with permed hair. The 'Sciura' is often to be to be seen in the high-end areas of Milan, strolling the streets, going to the theatre, shopping, or simply having an espresso.

Sciura and class 
The origins of ‘Sciura’ is rooted in the old aristocratic society of Milan. The connection between the essence of 'Sciura' and the upper class hierarchical system is undeniable. Consumption as a way of displaying and defining your social relations and identity has been a crucial point in the theory of the Consumer Culture. As ‘Sciura’ taste has become synonymous with luxury, the display of this certain style has therefore become an activity in which one displays wealth and upper class. This act of using commodities as a form of visibly expressing ones wealth is what the American sociologist Thorstein Veblen called conspicuous consumption, and has become an essential part of the ‘Sciura’ way of living and how to portray one's own personal brand.

Sciura, snob effect and manifestation in media 
'Sciura' has been found in fashion, Films, Theatres, literature and in television for over a decade. The fashion world especially adopted the classical features of the ‘Sciura’ and from a 60-year-old Isabella Rossellini starring in the Bulgari advertisement in 2012 to Lauren Hutton closing the Bottega Veneta show together with Gigi Hadid in 2017, the fashion world the fashion world is adopting more and more to the dressing codes of the elders.

The ‘Sciura’ prefers exclusive, unusual and unique goods, which is called showing a snob appeal. How they are dressing is a way to communicate the status in a silent but effective way, where a high price also means high quality. The goods often have high value, but low practical value and the rarer the item is, the higher the snob value will be. They are influencing our contemporary society with the so called snob effect which is making the ‘Sciurastyle' grow and can therefore be seen many brands at the moment. Brands like Balenciaga, Marc Jacobs, Prada and Gucci bring back its classic cuts and embraces the snob appeal.

Sciura as influencer 
The ‘Sciure’ appearance in social media is increasing rapidly. Through the Instagram profile Sciuraglam the ‘Sciura’ has become famous to the wider public. The Instagram account with has over 205 K followers (July 2021) is a dedication to these elderly fashionistas that quickly became a phenomenon. The account captures real life Street Style photographs of the Sciura's moments of everyday life in the city of Milan. There is a presence of humor and sarcasm in the Instagram account, although it is strongly implied that the ‘Sciura’ is to be adored and iconized. A stereotypical post in Sciuraglam would be a photograph of a lady who will do grocery shopping in her Chanel suit or taking the tram with her Hermès Birkin bag in hand. The pictures that are seen on Sciuraglam are pictures both taken by the owner of the Instagram account but also pictures sent by the Sciura's themselves, honored and eager to be featured on the page.

Sciura in real life 
Cecilia Matteucci Lavarini is a "Sciura-character" that often features in the Instagram account Sciuraglam. In her own Instagram account she describes herself as a "Haute Couture and Oriental Costume Collector. Enthusiastic supporter of concert, opera and ballet..".

Sciura in different cultures 
Outside Milan there is influencers or fashion icons that can be seen as cross cultural 'Sciura's'. In New York, Iris Apfel, Helen Van Winkle aka Baddiewinkle or even Anna Wintour can be categorized as a 'Sciura' when looking at their attributes such as style, social class and habit. These are fashion icons that have reached millions of followers on Instagram thanks to their daring style and personality.

References

External links 
 Sciuraglam
 Cecilia Matteucci Lavarini

Culture in Milan